Behind Silk Curtains is a 1988 Hong Kong grand production serial drama produced by TVB featuring an ensemble cast from the TV station including veteran actors Adam Cheng, Liza Wang, Ray Lui and future award-winning cinematic stars Tony Leung Chiu-Wai and Stephen Chow.

Plot
Wealthy businessman Ling Hin-kwong's (Peter Yang) "Tai Fook Company" is in the verge of collapse and his daughter Ling Ka-man (Liza Wang) persuades him to let Cheng Sai-cheung (Adam Cheng), chairman of the People's Bank, to join the shares. Kwong thinks Man is to ambitious and cannot trust her, so he finds a solution with his son Ling Ka-yip (Tony Leung Chiu-Wai), who recently returned from the United States. However, Yip dies in a car accident, where Kwong suffers bereavement, while also oppressed by Cheung, finally declares bankruptcy. When Ling Ka-man and Cheng Sai-cheung's plan of annexing Tai Fook fell through, in order to develop her career, Man induces Lam Ling-chi (Jaime Chik) to leave Cheung, while Man marries with Cheung.

Cheng Sai-cheung's son Cheng Lap-kei (Stephen Chow) marries with the daughter of the People's Bank's boss, who has a son Ho-yin (Leung Sze-ho) with her ex-husband. Cheung is his sister in-law Yee-chu (Wing Lam) and Ho-yin's settlor, and takes advantage of Ho-yin's decision-making power in the bank to reap profits. Ling Hin-kwong's youngest son Ling Ka-ming (David Siu) marries Yee-chu. Cheung fears the two will vie for property, so he conspires with Ming's ex-girlfriend Maggie (Money Lo) to destroy their relationship. When Ming learns of Cheung's scheme, he searches for evidence of Cheung and his son Kei's embezzlement. In order to cover up his crimes, Cheung mistakenly kills his partner To Ming (Ray Lui).

Cast

Adam Cheng
Liza Wang
Tony Leung
Stephen Chow
Ray Lui
Peter Yang
Jaime Chik
Carina Lau
Chingmy Yau
David Siu
Wing Lam
Money Lo
Elliot Ngok
Spencer Leung
Pauline Yeung
Elizabeth Lee
Seung Yee
Ng Yuen-yee
Kitty Lai
Frankie Lam
Chung Sai-kuen
Kong Wing-fai
Yip Pik-wan
Lau Sau-ping
Cho Tak-kin
Wong Wan-choi
Liu Kai-chi
Eddie Kwan
Eugina Lau
Leung Siu-chau
Wong San
Tsui Po-lun
Ling Lai-man
Lau On-kei
Lo Hoi-pang
Deric Wan
Tam Chuen-ming
Gallen Lo
Benz Hui
Roger Kwok
Leung Kin-ping
Law Ching-ho
Ho Mei-ting
Chan Yuk-lun
Lam Fan
Kwan Ching
Yu Mo-lin
Mui Lan
Hui Yat-wah
Lam Mei-kwan
Eddy Ko
Kwan Hoi-san
Leung Hung-wah
Evergreen Mak
Tsui Ka-po
Lee Chung-ning
Chan Kwok-chi
Cutie Mui
Yeung Kai-fong
Lee Heung-kam
Johnny Ngan
Chan Yau-hau
Pak Lan
Kong Ning
Chan Chung-kin
Ho Wai-lung
Kong Ngai
Ng Man-tat
Sit Chun

External links
Behind Silk Curtains at Jujang.com

Hong Kong television series
TVB dramas
1988 Hong Kong television series debuts
1988 Hong Kong television series endings
Hong Kong television shows
1980s Hong Kong television series
Serial drama television series
Cantonese-language television shows